The 1999 Tulane Green Wave football team represented Tulane University in the 1999 NCAA Division I-A football season. The Green Wave played their home games at the Louisiana Superdome. They competed in Conference USA. The team was coached by head coach Chris Scelfo.

Schedule

Roster

Team players in the NFL

References

Tulane
Tulane Green Wave football seasons
Tulane Green Wave football